The music video "Newport (Ymerodraeth State of Mind)" is a parody of the Jay-Z and Alicia Keys song "Empire State of Mind," replacing references to the "Empire State" of New York with references to the city of Newport in South Wales. The word "ymerodraeth" means "empire" in Welsh.

Production and release
The video was directed by the London-based filmmaker MJ Delaney, and featured London-based actors Alex Warren and Terema Wainwright, rapping and singing respectively. The lyrics were written by Tom Williams, Leo Sloley and MJ Delaney.

Published on the web on 20 July 2010, the video went viral and was featured by BBC News. By the middle of August 2010, nearly 2.5 million people had watched it on YouTube. YouTube removed the video on 10 August due to a copyright claim by music publishers EMI Music Publishing.

The lack of a fair dealing exclusion for parody works, exercised by EMI in their takedown notice, was cited in the Hargreaves Review on Copyright, commissioned by the Newport-based Intellectual Property Office. The review evolved into the Copyright (Public Administration) Regulations 2014.

The song includes references to Welsh celebrities such as Shirley Bassey, Craig Bellamy and Gavin Henson, and to Welsh stereotypes such as Welsh rarebit and leeks, along with Newport references such as Newport Gwent Dragons and the A4042 road. Warren and Wainwright were greeted with applause when they performed the song in Newport at the 2010 Newport Cityfest.

Josie d'Arby is name-checked with the explanation: "Yes, it's strange, we didn't know either - Thankyou Wikipedia!"

Responses
Newport-based rap group Goldie Lookin Chain released a "parody of a parody" video in response titled "You're Not From Newport", alleging that their rivals lacked local knowledge.

The song was the inspiration for actor Russell Gomer's parody "Ain't Seen Ruthin Yet", based on the song You Ain't Seen Nothing Yet by Bachman–Turner Overdrive and the town of Ruthin in Denbighshire.

Comic Relief 2011 included a new parody video directed by MJ Delaney featuring Welsh celebrities lip-synching to the song, including Josie d'Arby and Steve Jones who were namechecked in the original parody. It is available to download via iTunes. Other celebrities were  Paul Whitehouse, Siân Lloyd, Connie Fisher, John Humphrys, Gethin Jones, Helen Lederer, Robbie Savage, Anneka Rice, Ruth Madoc, Tim Vincent, Howard Marks, Gareth Jones, Lisa Rogers, Helen Adams, Max Boyce, Joe Calzaghe, Dirty Sanchez, Wynne Evans, Goldie Lookin Chain, Colin Jackson, Grant Nicholas, Shakin' Stevens, Michael Sheen, Imogen Thomas, Bonnie Tyler, Alex Jones and Ian Woosnam.

References

External links
  published by Comic Relief

2010s music videos
Musical parodies
Culture in Newport, Wales
Songs about Wales
Viral videos